Live Two Five is a live album recorded during three shows at the Red Deer Fine Arts Center in Alberta, Canada, in 1991. The concert recording marks the twenty-fifth anniversary of The Nitty Gritty Dirt Band despite the absence of founding member John McEuen. The tracks on this collection are live versions of songs that were previously released as well as a new song.

Track listing
"High Horse" (Jimmy Ibbotson) – 2:53
"I've Been Lookin'" (Jimmy Ibbotson, Jeff Hanna) – 3:12
"Make a Little Magic" (Jeff Hanna, Richard Hathaway, Bob Carpenter) – 3:12
"You Ain't Goin' Nowhere" (Bob Dylan) – 3:11
"Long Hard Road (Sharecropper's Dream)" (Rodney Crowell) – 3:44
"Stand a Little Rain" (Don Schlitz, Donny Lowery) – 4:38
"Dance Little Jean" (Jimmy Ibbotson) – 3:35
"Mr. Bojangles" (Jerry Jeff Walker) – 4:12
"Workin' Man (Nowhere To Go)" (Jimmie Fadden) – 3:42
"Ripplin' Waters" (Jimmy Ibbotson) – 10:46
"El Harpo" (Jimmie Fadden, Bob Carpenter) – 5:41
"Fishin' in the Dark" (Wendy Waldman, Jim Photoglo) – 3:17
"Baby's Got a Hold on Me" (Josh Leo, Jeff Hanna, Jimmy Ibbotson) – 2:58
"Face on the Cutting Room Floor" (Steve Goodman, Jeff Hanna, Jimmy Ibbotson) – 3:06
"Partners, Brothers and Friends" (Jimmy Ibbotson, Jeff Hanna) – 3:46
"Cadillac Ranch" (Bruce Springsteen) – 4:09

Personnel
Jeff Hanna – vocals, electric, acoustic and slide guitar
Jimmy Ibbotson – vocals, acoustic guitar, mandolin, electric bass
Jimmie Fadden – drums, percussion, harmonica, background vocals
Bob Carpenter – vocals, piano, synthesizer, keyboards, keyboard bass, accordion

Chart performance

References
All information is from the album liner notes unless otherwise noted.

Nitty Gritty Dirt Band albums
1991 live albums
Albums produced by T Bone Burnett